Kenne Duncan (February 17, 1903 – February 5, 1972) was a Canadian-born American B-movie character actor. Hyped professionally as "The Meanest Man in the Movies," the vast majority of his over 250 appearances on camera were Westerns, but he also did occasional forays into horror, crime drama, and science fiction. He also appeared in over a dozen serials.

Early years
Duncan was born Kenneth Duncan MacLachlan in Ontario, Canada.

Before he became an actor, Duncan enjoyed riding, and for a time he worked as a jockey. His accomplishments in that field included winning the steeplechase at Blue Bonnets raceway in Montreal, Quebec, Canada.

Career 
Duncan is best known, in some circles, for his work with Ed Wood. Duncan appeared in five Wood productions: Night of the Ghouls, Trick Shooting with Kenne Duncan, Crossroad Avenger, The Sinister Urge, and The Lawless Rider, a film Wood did with Yakima Canutt in the Director's chair. Duncan's final appearances on screen were Wood's low-budget The Sinister Urge, and a bit part in an episode of Rawhide ("Incident of the Sharpshooter"). He also made television appearances, especially westerns, such as The Cisco Kid, Bat Masterson, The Life and Legend of Wyatt Earp, and Tombstone Territory. He retired from filmmaking in 1961 at age 58.

Duncan had a reputation for being a womanizer with his female co-stars, and had a reputation in Hollywood for being very well endowed. Actress Valda Hansen remarked "Kenne Duncan kept whispering obscene things in my ear, over and over between takes, such as "Do you like tongues?"....Finally I had had enough of the old wolf, so I screamed over the mikes on the set "Oh, shut up!"....and everyone cracked up." Filmmaker Ron Ashcroft recalled "Kenne had a book, and it was quite thick, of the women that he had in bed. He said there was over a thousand in there. A thousand women." Makeup man Harry Thomas saw Kenne Duncan naked at a Hollywood party once, and remarked years later to an interviewer "You know, all men are not created equal."

Death
On February 5, 1972, Duncan committed suicide by overdosing on barbiturates twelve days before his 69th birthday. His friend Ron Ashcroft recalled "When he committed suicide, I couldn't believe it. He was tired of living. Just like George Sanders, he had seen everything, done everything. All he did was sit around and watch television."  Duncan was buried at Grand View Memorial Park Cemetery in Glendale, California.

Ed Wood was named executor of Kenne Duncan's estate, and he held a small memorial funeral in his backyard around the swimming pool. Wood and his wife and friends took turns walking onto the diving board where each of them in turn would deliver a brief eulogy of the man.

Selected filmography

 Police Reporter (1928)
 A Man from Wyoming (1930) - Haley (uncredited)
 Derelict (1930) - Radio Man (uncredited)
 No Limit (1931) - Curly Andrews
 Grief Street (1931) - Newspaper Reporter (uncredited)
 Lovers Courageous (1932) - Cowboy (uncredited)
 Probation (1932) - Wedding Rehearsal Attendant (uncredited)
 The Mouthpiece (1932) - Office Worker (uncredited)
 Shadow River (1933)
 Undercover Men (1934) - Blake Hardy
 Gallant Defender (1935) - Goose Neck Smith (uncredited)
 From Nine to Nine (1936) - John Sommerset
 Thoroughbred (1936) - Chick Williams
 Cross My Heart (1937) - Steve King
 Make-Up (1937) - Lorenzo
 The Last Curtain (1937) - Garsatti
 The Colorado Kid (1937) - Sims Leather
 Flash Gordon's Trip to Mars (1938, Serial) - Airdrome Captain
 The Great Adventures of Wild Bill Hickok (1938, Serial) - Blacksmith (Ch.13) (uncredited)
 Frontier Scout (1938) - Crandall - Henchman
 The Spider's Web (1938, Serial) - Ram Singh
 Fighting Thoroughbreds (1939) - Brady
 North of the Yukon (1939) - Henchman Meeker
 Buck Rogers (1939, Serial) - Lieutenant Lacy
 Man from Texas (1939) - Speed Dennison
 Mickey the Kid (1939) - Henchman (uncredited)
 Overland with Kit Carson (1939, Serial) - Trapper (uncredited)
 The Fighting Renegade (1939) - Henchman (uncredited)
 Trigger Fingers (1939) - Henchman Johnson
 Flaming Lead (1939) - Larry - Ranch Hand
 Westbound Stage (1939) - Capt. Jim Wallace
 Emergency Squad (1940) - Jack (uncredited)
 Texas Renegades (1940) - Bill Willis
 The Sagebrush Family Trails West (1940) - Bart Wallace
 The Cheyenne Kid (1940) - Chet Adams
 Billy the Kid Outlawed (1940) - David Hendricks
 Murder on the Yukon (1940) - Tom - Henchman
 Covered Wagon Trails (1940) - Henchman Blaine
 Pinto Canyon (1940) - Fred Jones
 Land of the Six Guns (1940) - Max
 I Take This Oath (1940) - Car-Rental Clerk (uncredited)
 The Kid from Santa Fe (1940) - Joe Lavida
 Frontier Crusader (1940) - The Mesa Kid
 Sky Bandits (1940) - Brownie - Henchman
 Deadwood Dick (1940, Serial) - Two-Gun - Henchman (Ch. 7) (uncredited)
 Billy the Kid Outlawed (1940) - Dave Hendricks
 Roll Wagons Roll (1940) - Captain Clay
 Arizona Gang Busters (1940) - Sheriff Dan Kirk
 Trailing Double Trouble (1940) - Bob Horner
 The Green Archer (1940, Serial) - Michael Bellamy (uncredited)
 Billy the Kid's Gun Justice (1940) - Henchman Bragg
 Souls in Pawn (1940) - J.W. Carlton
 Buck Privates (1941) - Sergeant on Sidewalk with Sgt. Collins (uncredited)
 White Eagle (1941, Serial) - Kirk (uncredited)
 Outlaws of the Rio Grande (1941) - Marshal Bob Day
 Adventures of Captain Marvel (1941) - Barnett - Chief Henchman [Ch. 2-10]
 The Spider Returns (1941, Serial) - Ram Singh, Wentworth's Hindu Chauffeur
 Billy the Kid in Santa Fe (1941) - Henchman Scotty
 The Texas Marshal (1941) - Henchman Lefty (uncredited)
 The Deadly Game (1941) - Henchman #2
 Dynamite Canyon (1941) - Henchman Rod
 The Apache Kid (1941) - Henchman Benton (uncredited)
 King of the Texas Rangers (1941, Serial) - Nick - Henchman [Chs. 1–4,6-9]
 Billy the Kid Wanted (1941) - Henchman (uncredited)
 Riding the Sunset Trail (1941) - Jay Lynch
 The Lone Rider Fights Back (1941) - Barfly (uncredited)
 A Missouri Outlaw (1941) - Henchman Pete Chandler
 Billy the Kid's Round-Up (1941) - Henchman Joe (uncredited)
 Texas Man Hunt (1942) - Henchman Lake
 The Lone Rider and the Bandit (1942) - Saloon Henchman (uncredited)
 Code of the Outlaw (1942) - Plug - Henchman
 Raiders of the West (1942) - Harris - Dandy Gambler (uncredited)
 Heart of the Rio Grande (1942) - Train Passenger (uncredited)
 The Man with Two Lives (1942) - Jess Fowler
 The Lone Rider in Cheyenne (1942) - Deputy Walt
 Westward Ho (1942) - Henchman Dallas (uncredited)
 Perils of Nyoka (1942) - Abu
 The Sombrero Kid (1942) - Pete Raymond - Henchman (uncredited)
 Law and Order (1942) - Henchman Durgan
 The Secret Code (1942, Serial) - Marvin [Chs.1-3,5-6]
 Isle of Missing Men (1942) - Bob Henderson
 Foreign Agent (1942) - Tom, Federal Agent (uncredited)
 Overland Stagecoach (1942) - Posse Rider (uncredited)
 Texas to Bataan (1942) - Captain Anders
 Valley of Hunted Men (1942) - Nazi (uncredited)
 Outlaws of Boulder Pass (1942) - Henchman Mulie
 Red River Robin Hood (1942) - Henchman Ed Rance
 Trail Riders (1942) - Marshal Frank Hammond
 The Valley of Vanishing Men (1942, Serial) - Logan (uncredited)
 The Sundown Kid (1942) - Henchman
 The Kid Rides Again (1943) - Cowboy in Saloon (uncredited)
 Cheyenne Roundup (1943) - Express Rider (uncredited)
 Santa Fe Scouts (1943) - Hoodlum (uncredited)
 Wild Horse Stampede (1943) - Hanley
 Wolves of the Range (1943) - Henchman Adams
 Daredevils of the West (1943, Serial) - George Hooker [Ch. 9]
 Days of Old Cheyenne (1943) - Henchman Pete
 The Avenging Rider (1943) - Blackie
 Border Buckaroos (1943) - Tom Bancroft
 Wolves of the Range (1943) - Henchman Adams
 Fugitive of the Plains (1943) - R. J. Cole
 Batman (1943, Serial) - Fred - the Mechanic [Ch. 5-6] (uncredited)
 The Law Rides Again (1943) - Sheriff Jeff
 Wagon Tracks West (1943) - Henchman (uncredited)
 Blazing Frontier (1943) - Homesteader Clark (uncredited)
 Trail of Terror (1943) - Henchman Tom
 Swing Shift Maisie (1943) - Charlie - Ann's Blind Date (uncredited)
 Blazing Guns (1943) - Henchman Red Higgins
 The Man from the Rio Grande (1943) - Henchman
 Overland Mail Robbery (1943) - Hank (uncredited)
 Canyon City (1943) - Turner - Henchman (uncredited)
 In Old Oklahoma (1943) - Indignant Businessman on Train (uncredited)
 Pistol Packin' Mama (1943) - Doorman (uncredited)
 Raiders of Sunset Pass (1943) - Henchman Tex
 Pride of the Plains (1944) - Snyder - Henchman
 Hands Across the Border (1944) - Deputy (uncredited)
 The Fighting Seabees (1944) - Construction Worker (uncredited)
 Captain America (1944, Serial) - Ed Graham [Ch. 14] (uncredited)
 Beneath Western Skies (1944) - Deputy Barrow
 Mojave Firebrand (1944) - Tony Webb
 Hidden Valley Outlaws (1944) - Henchman Ben Bannon
 The Laramie Trail (1944) - Bud's Partner (uncredited)
 Outlaws of Santa Fe (1944) - Chuck - Henchman
 Tucson Raiders (1944) - Henchman (voice, uncredited)
 The Tiger Woman (1944) - Gentry - Henchman [Chs. 7, 11]
 Silent Partner (1944) - Gangster (uncredited)
 Man from Frisco (1944) - Foreman (uncredited)
 Marshal of Reno (1944) - Adams - Henchman
 Secrets of Scotland Yard (1944) - Steward (uncredited)
 The Girl Who Dared (1944) - Dr. Paul Dexter
 Song of Nevada (1944) - Thompson's Wagon-Race Driver (uncredited)
 Haunted Harbor (1944, Serial) - Gregg
 Stagecoach to Monterey (1944) - Joe - Henchman
 San Fernando Valley (1944) - Horse Thief (uncredited)
 Cheyenne Wildcat (1944) - Henchman Pete
 My Buddy (1944) - Convict (uncredited)
 Storm Over Lisbon (1944) - Paul-Deresco Aide
 End of the Road (1944) - Al Herman
 Sheriff of Sundown (1944) - Arthur Wilkes - Secretary
 Vigilantes of Dodge City (1944) - Henchman Dave Brewster
 Brazil (1944) - Cab Driver (uncredited)
 Thoroughbreds (1944) - (uncredited)
 Sheriff of Las Vegas (1944) - Whitey - Henchman
 Manhunt of Mystery Island (1945, Serial) - Sidney Brand
 Corpus Christi Bandits (1945) - Spade - Henchman
 The Phantom Speaks (1945) - Murder Victim (uncredited)
 Flame of Barbary Coast (1945) - Gambler (uncredited)
 Santa Fe Saddlemates (1945) - Brazos Kane
 A Sporting Chance (1945) - Boarder
 Bells of Rosarita (1945) - Kidnapper (uncredited)
 The Chicago Kid (1945) - Al
 Road to Alcatraz (1945) - Servant
 Trail of Kit Carson (1945) - Trigger Chandler
 Oregon Trail (1945) - Johnny Slade - Henchman
 Hitchhike to Happiness (1945) - Man in Bar (uncredited)
 The Purple Monster Strikes (1945, Serial) - Charles Mitchell [Chs. 1–2, 10]
 Love, Honor and Goodbye (1945) - Counter Man (uncredited)
 Rough Riders of Cheyenne (1945) - Lance - Henchman
 Dakota (1945) - Henchman (uncredited)
 Wagon Wheels Westward (1945) - Henchman Joe
 The Scarlet Horseman (1946, Serial) - Henchman (uncredited)
 The Phantom Rider (1946, Serial) - Ben Brady - Henchman
 A Guy Could Change (1946) - Frank Hanlon
 California Gold Rush (1946) - Henchman Felton
 Sheriff of Redwood Valley (1946) - Henchman Jackson
 Home on the Range (1946) - Henchman #2
 Rainbow Over Texas (1946) - Henchman Pete McAvoy
 Sun Valley Cyclone (1946) - Dow
 In Old Sacramento (1946) - Deputy (uncredited)
 Man from Rainbow Valley (1946) - Tracy's Partner
 Traffic in Crime (1946) - Henchman (uncredited)
 My Pal Trigger (1946) - Croupier
 Night Train to Memphis (1946) - Asa Morgan
 Red River Renegades (1946) - Henchman Hackett
 Conquest of Cheyenne (1946) - Geologist McBride
 G.I. War Brides (1946) - (uncredited)
 The Mysterious Mr. Valentine (1946) - Sam Priestly
 Rio Grande Raiders (1946) - Steve - Henchman
 Roll on Texas Moon (1946) - Henchman Brannigan
 The Crimson Ghost (1946, Serial) - Dr. Chambers [Chs. 1–2, 8]
 Santa Fe Uprising (1946) - Henchman
 Sioux City Sue (1946) - Crawley (uncredited)
 Angel and the Badman (1947) - Gambler (uncredited)
 Twilight on the Rio Grande (1947) - Lou Evers - U.S. Customs Agent (uncredited)
 Buck Privates Come Home (1947) - Sergeant on Sidewalk (uncredited)
 The Trespasser (1947) - Fellow (uncredited)
 Close-Up (1948) - Detective (uncredited)
 Sundown in Santa Fe (1948) - Wagon Driver (uncredited)
 Hidden Danger (1948) - Henchman Bender
 Crashing Thru (1949) - Ranger Tim Reymond
 Shadows of the West (1949) - Bill Mayberry
 Gun Runner (1949) - Nebraska
 Law of the West (1949) - Frank Stevens
 Stampede (1949) - Steve (uncredited)
 Across the Rio Grande (1949) - Joe Bardet
 West of El Dorado (1949) - Steve Dallas
 Range Justice (1949) - Henchman Kirk
 Roaring Westward (1949) - Morgan
 Deputy Marshal (1949) - Cal Freeling
 Riders in the Sky (1949) - Travis
 Lawless Code (1949) - Tom Blaine - Henchman
 Sons of New Mexico (1949) - Ed - Henchman (uncredited)
 Range Land (1949) - Sheriff Winters
 Davy Crockett, Indian Scout (1950) - Sgt. Gordon
 Radar Secret Service (1950) - Michael's Henchman
 Mule Train (1950) - Latigo (uncredited)
 Code of the Silver Sage (1950) - Dick Cantwell - Henchman
 Jiggs and Maggie Out West (1950) - Slim - Henchman (uncredited)
 A Life of Her Own (1950) - Man Asking Invitation (uncredited)
 Surrender (1950) - Rider Warning of Gregg (uncredited)
 Indian Territory (1950) - 3rd Man Shot by Apache (uncredited)
 Last of the Buccaneers (1950) - Pirate Captain (uncredited)
 The Blazing Sun (1950) - Al Bartlett & Mark Bartlett
 Wanted: Dead or Alive (1951) - Henchman (uncredited)
 Badman's Gold (1951) - Rance
 Whirlwind (1951) - Slim - Henchman (uncredited)
 Nevada Badmen (1951) - Bob Bannon (uncredited)
 The Texas Rangers (1951) - Bart Howard - Outlaw (uncredited)
 Silver Canyon (1951) - Corporal (uncredited)
 Oklahoma Justice (1951) - Sheriff Barnes
 The Hills of Utah (1951) - Indigo Hubbard - Henchman
 Drums in the Deep South (1951) - Union Officer (uncredited)
 Indian Uprising (1952) - Lt. Richards (uncredited)
 The Frontier Phantom (1952) - Sam Mantell
 On Top of Old Smoky (1953) - McQuaid
 Jack McCall, Desperado (1953) - Gang Member at Party (uncredited)
 Pack Train (1953) - Ross McLain
 The Lawless Rider (1954) - Freno Frost
 Hell's Horizon (1955) - Maj. Naylor
 Flesh and the Spur (1956) - Kale Tanner
 Revolt at Fort Laramie (1957) - Capt. Foley (uncredited)
 Outlaw Queen (1957) - Sheriff
 The Iron Sheriff (1957) - Leveret's Brother-in-Law (uncredited)
 The Parson and the Outlaw (1957) - Matt McCloud (uncredited)
 The Astounding She-Monster (1957) - Nat Burdell
 Date with Death (1959) - Andrews - Freight-Train Watchman
 Revenge of the Virgins (1959) - Narrator (voice, uncredited)
 Night of the Ghouls (1959) - Dr. Acula
 Oklahoma Territory (1960) - Bigelow Henchman (uncredited)
 The Music Box Kid (1960) - Truck Driver's Helper (uncredited)
 Natchez Trace (1960) - William Murrell
 The Sinister Urge (1960) - Lt. Matt Carson
 Like Wow! (1962) - Car Salesman

Selected Television

References

External links

 
 
 

1903 births
1972 suicides
Male actors from Ontario
Canadian emigrants to the United States
Canadian male film actors
Canadian male television actors
Drug-related suicides in California
Barbiturates-related deaths
People from Chatham-Kent
20th-century Canadian male actors
1972 deaths